Pasadena is a city in Los Angeles County, California,  northeast of downtown Los Angeles. It is the most populous city and the primary cultural center of the San Gabriel Valley. Old Pasadena is the city's original commercial district.

Its population was 138,699 at the 2020 census, making it the 44th largest city in California and the ninth-largest city in Los Angeles County. Pasadena was incorporated on June 19, 1886, becoming one of the first cities to be incorporated in what is now Los Angeles County, following the city of Los Angeles (April 4, 1850).

Pasadena is known for hosting the annual Rose Bowl football game and Tournament of Roses Parade. It is also home to many scientific, educational, and cultural institutions, including Caltech, Pasadena City College, Kaiser Permanente Bernard J. Tyson School of Medicine, Fuller Theological Seminary, ArtCenter College of Design, the Pasadena Playhouse, the Ambassador Auditorium, the Norton Simon Museum, and the USC Pacific Asia Museum.

History

Indigenous peoples and Spanish colonial era
The original inhabitants of Pasadena (from the Tongva language name "Pasakeg-na") and surrounding areas were members of the Native American Hahamog-na tribe, a branch of the Tongva Nation. They spoke the Tongva language (part of the Uto-Aztecan languages group). Native Americans had lived in the Los Angeles Basin for thousands of years. Tongva dwellings lined the Arroyo Seco (Los Angeles County) in present day Pasadena and south to where it joins the Los Angeles River and along other natural waterways in the city.

The native people lived in thatched, dome-shape lodges and lived on a diet of acorn meal, seeds and herbs, venison, and other small animals as well as trading for ocean fish with the coastal Tongva. They made cooking vessels from steatite soapstone from Catalina Island. The oldest transportation route still in existence in Pasadena is the old Tongva foot trail, also known as the Gabrielino Trail, that follows the west side of the Rose Bowl and the Arroyo Seco past the Jet Propulsion Laboratory into the San Gabriel Mountains. The trail has been in continuous use for thousands of years. An arm of the trail is also still in use in what is now known as the Salvia Canyon.

The Spanish first colonized the Los Angeles Basin in the 1770s as part of the Viceroyalty of New Spain, building the San Gabriel Mission and renaming the local Tongva people "Gabrielino Indians", after the name of the mission. Today, several bands of Tongva people live in the Los Angeles area.

Mexican rancho era and early American era
In 1821, Mexico became independent of Spain and California came under control of the Mexican government. In 1833, the mission lands were secularized and most of the lands in California were granted to private Mexican citizens in the form of ranchos. Present-day Pasadena was divided between Rancho San Rafael (lands west of the Arroyo Seco extending to present-day Burbank in the northwest to Glassell Park in the southwest), Rancho del Rincon de San Pascual, (present-day central Pasadena, Altadena, and South Pasadena), and Rancho Santa Anita (present-day east Pasadena, Arcadia, and Monrovia). Rancho del Rincon de San Pascual was so named because it was deeded on Easter Sunday to Eulalia Perez de Guillén Mariné of Mission San Gabriel Arcángel.

Before the annexation of California in 1848 by the United States at the end of the Mexican-American war, the last of the Mexican owners of Rancho del Rincon de San Pascual was Manuel Garfias who retained title to the property after statehood in 1850. Garfias sold sections of the property to the first Anglo settlers to come into the area: Dr. Benjamin Eaton, the father of Fred Eaton; and Dr. S. Griffin. Much of the property was purchased by Benjamin Wilson, who established his Lake Vineyard property in the vicinity. Wilson, known as Don Benito to the local Indians, also owned the Rancho Jurupa (Riverside, California) and was mayor of Los Angeles. He was the grandfather of WWII General George S. Patton, Jr. and the namesake of Mount Wilson.

In 1873, Wilson was visited by Dr. Daniel M. Berry of Indiana who was looking for a place in the country that could offer a mild climate for his patients, most of whom suffered from respiratory ailments. Berry was an asthmatic and claimed that he had his best three night's sleep at Rancho San Pascual. To keep the find a secret, Berry code-named the area "Muscat" after the grape that Wilson grew. To raise funds to bring the company of people to San Pascual, Berry formed the Southern California Orange and Citrus Growers Association and sold stock in it. The newcomers were able to purchase a large portion of the property along the Arroyo Seco and on January 31, 1874, they incorporated the Indiana Colony. As a gesture of good will, Wilson added  of then-useless highland property, part of which would become Altadena. Colonel Jabez Banbury opened the first school on South Orange Grove Avenue. Banbury had twin daughters, named Jennie and Jessie. The two became the first students to attend Pasadena's first school on Orange Grove.

At the time, the Indiana Colony was a narrow strip of land between the Arroyo Seco and Fair Oaks Avenue. On the other side of the street was Wilson's Lake Vineyard development. After more than a decade of parallel development on both sides, the two settlements merged into the City of Pasadena.

Pasadena as a resort town (1886–1941)
The popularity of the region drew people from across the country, and Pasadena eventually became a stop on the Atchison, Topeka and Santa Fe Railway, which led to an explosion in growth. From the real estate boom of the 1880s until the Great Depression, as great tourist hotels were developed in the city, Pasadena became a winter resort for wealthy Easterners, spurring the development of new neighborhoods and business districts, and increased road and transit connections with Los Angeles, culminating with the opening of the Arroyo Seco Parkway, California's first freeway. By 1940, Pasadena had become the eighth-largest city in California and was widely considered a twin city to Los Angeles.

The first of the great hotels to be established in Pasadena was the Raymond (1886) atop Bacon Hill, renamed Raymond Hill after construction. Pasadena was served by the Atchison, Topeka and Santa Fe Railway at the Santa Fe Depot in downtown when the Second District was opened in 1887. The original Mansard Victorian 200-room facility burned down on Easter morning of 1895, was rebuilt in 1903, and razed during the Great Depression to make way for residential development. The Maryland Hotel existed from the early 1900s and was demolished in 1934. The world-famous Mount Lowe Railway and associated mountain hotels shut down four years later due to fire damage. Three hotel structures have survived, the Green Hotel (a co-op since 1926), the Vista Del Arroyo (now used as a Federal courthouse), and a residential tower of the Maryland at 80 North Euclid Avenue (a co-op since 1953).

The American Craftsman era in art and design is well represented in Pasadena. The architectural firm Greene and Greene developed the style; many of its residences still stand. Two examples of their Ultimate bungalow are the masterpiece Gamble House, of which public tours are available, and the Robert R. Blacker House, both designated California Historical Landmarks and enrolled on the U.S. National Register of Historic Places.

World War II and aftermath (1941–1969)

The Second World War proved to be a boon to Pasadena as Southern California became a major staging area for the Pacific War. High tech manufacturing and scientific companies made the city their home, a trend which continued in the decades following the war, notably with NASA's Jet Propulsion Laboratory, Tetra Tech and Ameron International.

In the 1950s, Pasadena saw a steady influx of people from the Southern United States, especially African-Americans from Texas and Louisiana. Pasadena also began hosting a large immigrant community, particularly from China, Japan, Philippines, Mexico, Guatemala, El Salvador, Italy, Armenia, and India.

Pasadena since 1970
The American Academy of Dramatic Arts, founded in 1884 in New York, opened its Pasadena campus in 1974. However, in 2001 the conservatory moved from Pasadena to Hollywood. Training actors for the stage in a two year program, the conservatory was the first school in the United States to offer professional education in the field of acting. Point Loma Nazarene University was located in Pasadena for many years before relocating to San Diego County, and retained the names Pasadena University and Pasadena College.

In 1969, the Pasadena Unified School District was desegregated, though the issue would continue to be fought in court for a decade. A year later, the 210 Freeway was built along a newly chosen route. The freeway's construction was controversial, as it caused the demolition of over a thousand homes, many historic, and many claimed that the route was designed to cut off the city's less wealthy neighborhoods.

Downtown Pasadena became dangerous in some parts and deserted in others, and incidences of murder and arson skyrocketed. Old Pasadena faced destruction as plans for new high-rise developments were drawn up, though they were mostly stopped by increasingly active preservation advocates. Pasadena suffered demographically as many residents decamped for the nearby suburbs or the Inland Empire, causing an overall decrease in population. Despite these setbacks, many local artists and hipsters moved in to take advantage of low property values. Their legacy can be seen today in the Doo Dah Parade which began in 1976.

In 2014, several arrests were made involving an embezzlement scheme which stole money from the UUP. The amount is estimated to be $6.4 million.

Geography

The greater Pasadena area is bounded by the Raymond Fault line, the San Rafael Hills, and the San Gabriel Mountains. The Arroyo Seco, a major geographic feature and home of the Rose Bowl, flows from headwaters in Pasadena's towering Angeles National Forest greenbelt in the San Gabriel Mountains.

Climate

Pasadena has a Mediterranean climate (Köppen Csa), with typically hotter summers and slightly cooler winters than nearby coastal areas. Its location relative to the San Gabriel mountains allows the orographic lift to add several more inches of rainfall per year than nearby areas. During the first few months of the year, Pasadena experiences cool to warm highs, typically in the upper 60s to lower 70s. Colder days are usually accompanied by heavier rain. By April, temperatures warm further, and rain tapers off significantly.

By May and June, rain is typically sparse, but the infamous marine layer becomes more persistent. Locals have dubbed June "June Gloom" as it is the cloudiest month despite being the 3rd driest month. By July, the marine layer subsides as inland areas cool due to an increased monsoon flow. Heatwaves from July through October can be oppressive and lengthy. In addition, it rarely rains during the summer and fall months, and only does when the remnants of hurricanes and tropical storms pass by. In fact, some days in both July and August have never recorded rainfall. It is not impossible to go 6 months without measurable precipitation.

The hottest heatwaves of the year usually occur in mid to late September. By late October, temperatures drop off. By November, Pacific storms return to Pasadena, bringing increasingly heavy rain and cooler weather. Along with them, however, are the Santa Ana winds. The Santa Ana winds can produce heat, high winds, power outages, tree damage and an increased wildfire threat whenever they strike. By December, lows typically drop into the 40s with the occasional reading in the 30s. A high temperature of at least  has been recorded on all 365 days of the year, with temperatures over  possible April through early November.

Pasadena averages  of rain a year, about  more than nearby Los Angeles due to the orographic effect created by the San Gabriel Mountains. Wet years are commonly associated with El Niño warm surface water in the eastern Pacific and dry years with La Niña cold water conditions.

Situated at the base of the San Gabriel Mountains, snow is known to fall occasionally in Pasadena. The heaviest snowfall in Pasadena history occurred on January 11, 1949;  fell at Pasadena's city hall and more than  fell in the foothills above the city.

On November 30 and December 1, 2011, Pasadena, along with surrounding communities, was struck by a major windstorm caused by Santa Ana winds. The city suffered heavy damage with trees toppled, buildings damaged and even the roof of a gas station torn off.

The official NOAA weather station for the city is located just north-west of the townhall on the other side of Garfield Avenue.

Demographics

2010
The 2010 United States Census reported that Pasadena had a population of 137,122. The racial makeup of Pasadena was 76,550 (55.8%) White, 14,650 (10.7%) African American, down from 19.0% in 1990, 827 (0.6%) Native American, 19,595 (14.3%) Asian, 134 (0.1%) Pacific Islander, 18,675 (13.6%) from other races, and 6,691 (4.9%) from two or more races. Hispanic or Latino of any race numbered 46,174 persons (33.7%). Non-Hispanic whites were 38.8% of the population, down from 70.4% in 1970.

The Census reported that 133,629 people (97.5% of the population) lived in households, 2,472 (1.8%) lived in non-institutionalized group quarters, and 1,021 (0.7%) were institutionalized.

There were 55,270 households, out of which 14,459 (26.2%) had children under the age of 18 living in them, 22,285 (40.3%) were married couples living together, 6,131 (11.1%) had a female householder with no husband present, 2,460 (4.5%) had a male householder with no wife present. There were 3,016 (5.5%) unmarried partnerships. 18,838 households (34.1%) were made up of individuals, and 5,748 (10.4%) had someone living alone who was 65 years of age or older. The average household size was 2.42. There were 30,876 families (55.9% of all households); the average family size was 3.18.

The age distribution of the population was as follows: 26,507 people (19.3%) were under the age of 18, 12,609 people (9.2%) aged 18 to 24, 45,371 people (33.1%) aged 25 to 44, 34,073 people (24.8%) aged 45 to 64, and 18,562 people (13.5%) who were 65 years of age or older. The median age was 37.2 years. For every 100 females, there were 95.1 males. For every 100 females age 18 and over, there were 93.5 males.

The homeowner vacancy rate was 2.3%; the rental vacancy rate was 6.6%. 64,306 people (46.9% of the population) lived in owner-occupied housing units and 69,323 people (50.6%) lived in rental housing units.

According to the 2010 United States Census, Pasadena had a median household income of $69,302, with 13.2% of the population living below the federal poverty line.

During 2015–2019, Pasadena had a median household income of $83,068, with 14.5% of the population living below the federal poverty line. For people ages 25 and over, 88.3% had a high school degree or higher while 52.3% had a Bachelor's degree or higher.

Economy
According to the City's 2018 Comprehensive Annual Financial Report, the top employers in the city are:

Other companies based in Pasadena include Avery Dennison, Cogent Systems, Idealab, Inter-Con Security, Goldstar Events, Jacobs Engineering Group, Green Dot Corporation, Tetra Tech, Wesco Financial, OpenX, Stark Spirits Distillery and Wetzel's Pretzels. The Los Angeles-area office of China Eastern Airlines is located in Pasadena.

Shopping and dining

Old Town Pasadena spans 21 blocks downtown. It boasts shops and a wide variety of restaurants, nightclubs, outdoor cafés, pubs, and comedy clubs. "One Colorado" features renovated historic architecture that attracted the new retail stores and restaurants. This development filled vacant buildings and was the impetus of the revitalization of Old Town on Colorado Boulevard. Paseo Colorado is an upscale shopping mall designed to be a modern urban village. An open-air mall that covers three city blocks, Paseo Colorado is anchored on the west end by upscale grocery store Gelson's (recently closed), on the east end by Macy's (also closed) and Arclight Cinemas centers the middle portion of the mall. Another shopping district is located in the South Lake Avenue neighborhood. On Lake Avenue, a Macy's department store and furniture gallery is in a registered California historical landmark. The building was originally designed and built as the fourth Bullock's department store in the mid-1950s (the last freestanding store they constructed).

Rose Bowl Flea Market
The Rose Bowl Flea Market is a large swap meet that involves thousands of dealers and tens of thousands of visitors in and around the grounds of the Rose Bowl. The merchandise on display ranges from old world antiques to California pottery to vintage clothing. The flea market has been held every second Sunday of the month since 1967.

Arts and culture

Tournament of Roses Parade

Pasadena is home to the Tournament of Roses Parade, held each year on January 1 (or on January 2, if the 1st falls on a Sunday). The first parade was held in 1890 and was originally sponsored by the Valley Hunt Club, a Pasadena social club. The motivation for having the parade was, as member Professor Charles F. Holder said, "In New York, people are buried in snow. Here our flowers are blooming and our oranges are about to bear. Let's hold a festival to tell the world about our paradise."

By 1895, the festivities had outgrown the Valley Hunt Club, and the Tournament of Roses Association was formed to take charge of the parade. The Rose Parade, as it is familiarly known, traditionally features elaborate floats, bands and equestrian units. According to the organizers, "Every inch of every float must be covered with flowers, or other natural materials, such as leaves, seeds, or bark. On average a float requires about 100,000 flowers and greenery. Volunteer workers swarm over the floats in the days after Christmas, their hands and clothes covered with glue and petals." The most perishable flowers are placed in small vials of water, which are placed onto the float individually. Over the almost 3 hours of the parade, floats, and participants travel over five miles (8 km) and pass by over one million viewers who traditionally camp out over New Year's Eve to have the best view along the parade route.

The Rose Parade is satirized by the popular Doo Dah Parade, an annual event that originated in Old Pasadena in 1978, and soon gained national notoriety. Reader's Digest named the Doo Dah Parade "America's Best Parade", and was a recent feature in 50 Places You Must Visit Before You Die!. It was formerly held around Thanksgiving, a month before the Rose Parade, but the parade is now held in January. In 2011, after 33 years in Pasadena, the parade moved to East Pasadena for the first time. It features unusual and absurd entrants such as the BBQ & Hibachi Marching Grill Team, the Men of Leisure, and the Bastard Sons of Lee Marvin. Proceeds from the parade's pancake breakfast, T-shirts, and after-party are donated to charity.

Rose Bowl Game

The Rose Bowl, a National Historic Landmark, is host of the first and most famous college football postseason bowl game, the Tournament of Roses Rose Bowl Game, every New Year's Day. In 1895, the Tournament of Roses Association was formed to take charge of the parade. In 1902, the association declared that a football game would be added to the day's events. This was the first post-season college football game to be played on New Year's Day and is known as, "The Grandaddy of Them All"; many other football stadiums followed suit. After two decades, the game outgrew its original facility, and a new stadium was constructed in the Arroyo Seco area. The new stadium hosted its first New Year's Day football game in 1923. It was soon christened "The Rose Bowl", as was the game itself.

Performing arts
The legendary Pasadena Playhouse, the State Theater of California, is a member supported theater company that celebrated their centennial season in 2018. The theater puts on five shows a year. In 1937, the Pasadena Playhouse established a record as the only theatre in the United States to have staged the entire Shakespearean canon. Today, the Playhouse is known for their innovative productions.

The Pasadena Symphony, founded in 1928, offers several concerts a year at the Ambassador Auditorium and the Pasadena Pops plays at the Los Angeles County Arboretum and Botanic Garden. The Civic Center also holds a few traveling Broadway shows each year.

Boston Court Performing Arts Center, opened in 2003, is near Lake and Colorado. Its resident theatre company, the award-winning The Theatre @ Boston Court, presents four productions a year. Music at the Court presents numerous music concerts each year, ranging from classical to jazz. The Friends of the Levitt organization presents a free summer concert series in Memorial Park, with the 2008 summer season marking its sixth year.

Beckman Auditorium and other venues on the Caltech campus present a wide range of performing arts, lectures, films, classes and entertainment events, primarily during the academic year.

For more than ten years, twice annually Pasadena's cultural institutions have opened their doors for free during ArtNight Pasadena, offering the public a rich sampling of quality art, artifacts and music within the city. This has evolved into the yearly PasadenART Weekend, a three-day citywide event which, as of 2007, encompasses ArtNight, ArtWalk, ArtHeritage, ArtMarket, and ArtPerformance, a vibrant outdoor music event showcasing emerging and nationally recognized talent. Free concerts take place on multiple stages throughout Old Pasadena.

Ambassador Auditorium was built under the guidance of Herbert W. Armstrong as both a facility to be used by the Worldwide Church of God for religious services and as a concert hall for public performances celebrating the performing arts. In 2007, the native Pasadena band Ozma reunited and produced the album Pasadena in tribute to the city. The album photos and artwork were shot at the Colorado Street Bridge.

The 1960s song "The Little Old Lady from Pasadena" parodies a popular Southern California image of Pasadena as home to a large population of aged eccentrics. In the song, Jan and Dean sing of an elderly lady who drives a powerful "Super Stock Dodge" muscle car and is "the terror of Colorado Boulevard." The Dead Kennedys paid a tribute to this archetypal song in the track "Buzzbomb From Pasadena" in the album Give Me Convenience or Give Me Death. Pasadena was also the location of the 2012 film Project X.

Visual arts
A number of artists of national repute, such as Guy Rose, Alson S. Clark, Marion Wachtel and Ernest A. Batchelder, of the Arts and Crafts Movement, made Pasadena their home in the early twentieth century. The formation of the California Art Club, Stickney Memorial Art School (later known as Pasadena Arts Institute) and the Pasadena Society of Artists heralded the city's emergence as a regional center for the visual arts.

Museums and galleries
Pasadena is home to a number of art museums and public galleries, including the Norton Simon Museum. The museum's collections include European paintings, sculpture, and tapestry; sculpture from Southern Asia; and an extensive sculpture garden. The museum also has the contemporary art collection of its predecessor, the Pasadena Museum of Art, which focused on modern and contemporary art before being taken over by Simon in the early 1970s.

Preserving and sharing the rich history and culture of Pasadena and its adjacent communities is the Pasadena Museum of History.

The Pacific Asia Museum, with a garden courtyard in its center, features art from the many countries and cultures of Asia. The nearby Pasadena Museum of California Art (recently closed) hosts changing exhibitions of work by historical and contemporary California artists. The Armory Center for the Arts has an extensive exhibition program as well as serving as a center for art education for all ages. Art Center College of Design offers exhibitions at its Williamson Gallery, as well as frequent displays of student work. Pasadena City College has an art gallery that shows work of professionals as part of their annual artist-in-residence program, as well as exhibiting work by students and faculty.

The Huntington Library and Botanical Gardens, with painting and sculpture galleries, is adjacent to Pasadena in the city of San Marino. The innovative Kidspace Children's Museum is located in Brookside Park.

Literature
Red Hen Press, one of the largest independent literary publishers on the US west coast, is located in Pasadena. The press publishes over twenty titles of poetry, fiction, and nonfiction each year as well as a biannual literary magazine called The Los Angeles Review.

In 2002 David Ebershoff published the novel Pasadena. The novel won praise for its accurate recreation of Pasadena before World War II.

Bungalow Heaven

Bungalow Heaven is a neighborhood of 800 small Craftsman homes built from 1900 to 1930. Many of these homes are still occupied. Much of the area became a landmark district in 1989, and annual historic home tours have been conducted since that designation. Bungalow Heaven's borders are Washington Boulevard to the north, Orange Grove Boulevard to the south, Mentor Avenue to the west, and Chester Avenue to the east. The neighborhood is usually extended to Lake Avenue to the west and Hill Avenue to the east.
Famed architects Greene and Greene built several of their Japanese-inspired bungalows in Pasadena, including the Gamble House; the style of the homes in Bungalow Heaven show the effects of their success.

Orange Grove Boulevard

The Norton Simon Museum is at the intersection of Orange Grove and Colorado Boulevards. This corner is the official start of the Rose Parade route and the museum can be quite clearly seen every year during the parade television broadcast.

Orange Grove Boulevard is one of several exclusive residential districts in Pasadena, and has been a home for the rich and famous since the early 20th century. Because of the number of landmark mansions, the street earned the name Millionaire's Row, an appropriate sobriquet considering that the estates that once lined this spacious boulevard and the surrounding neighborhood read like a Who's Who of American consumer products.

Historical estates
The maker of Wrigley's chewing gum, William Wrigley Jr.'s, substantial home was offered to the city of Pasadena after Mrs. Wrigley's death in 1958, under the condition that their home would be the Rose Parade's permanent headquarters. The stately Tournament House stands today, and serves as the headquarters for the Tournament of Roses Parade. Adolphus Busch, co-founder of Anheuser-Busch, brewer of Budweiser beer, established the first of a series of Busch Gardens in Pasadena. When Busch died at his Pasadena estate, his wife generously offered the property to the City of Pasadena, an offer the city inexplicably refused. Henry Markham, who lived adjacent to Busch, was the 18th Governor of the state of California (1891–1895) and wrote Pasadena: Its Early Years. The home of David Gamble, son of consumer product maker James Gamble of Procter & Gamble, is located on the north end of Orange Grove Boulevard.

The Gamble House, an American Craftsman masterpiece, was built in 1908, by architects Charles and Henry Greene, as an exemplification of their ultimate bungalow. It is open to the public as both an architectural conservancy and museum.

The Gamble House is a California Historical Landmark and a National Historic Landmark on the National Register of Historic Places. In 1966, it was deeded to the city of Pasadena in a mutual agreement with the University of Southern California School of Architecture. Every year, two fifth-year USC architecture students live in the house full-time. The students change yearly.

The home of Anna Bissell McCay, daughter of carpet sweeper magnate Melville Bissell, is a four-story Victorian home, on the border of South Pasadena. Today the Bissell House is a bed and breakfast. The house included a sixth story solarium which he converted into an observatory. Lowe was also a generous patron of the astronomical sciences. He started a water-gas company, founded the Citizens Bank of Los Angeles, built numerous ice plants, and purchased a Pasadena opera house. He also established the Mount Lowe Railway in the mountains above Pasadena and eventually lost his fortune. The brilliant, but troubled, rocket scientist John Whiteside Parsons sometimes shared his residence with other noteworthy people, including L. Ron Hubbard, the founder of Scientology. Parsons died in an explosion while testing a new rocket fuel in his Pasadena home laboratory, in 1952.

Sports

Rose Bowl Stadium

In addition to the annual New Year's Day Rose Bowl game and a College Football Playoff semi-final game every three years, the stadium is the home field for the UCLA Bruins football team and has hosted five Super Bowls and many BCS National Championship games. Important soccer games include the 1984 Summer Olympics, the final game of the 1994 FIFA World Cup, and the final game of the 1999 FIFA Women's World Cup.

The Rose Bowl stadium was the home ground for the Los Angeles Galaxy of Major League Soccer from the team's inception in 1996 until in 2003, it moved into the soccer-specific Home Depot Center (now Dignity Health Sports Park) in Carson, California. The venue additionally hosted the 1998 MLS Cup. Many concerts and other events have been held in the stadium, such as Beyonce and Jay Z's "On the Run Tour" on August 2, 2014.

Aquatic center
The Rose Bowl Aquatics Center sits next to the Rose Bowl Stadium. The pool hosted the final practices of the 2000 US Olympic swimming and diving team. In 2008, the facility held the U.S. National Diving Championships.

Tennis center
The Rose Bowl Tennis Center, operated by the city of Pasadena, is located due south of the Rose Bowl Stadium.

Professional futsal
The city of Pasadena is also home to a professional futsal team, the Pasadena Purple Cows, as seen in futsal in the United States. The Cows were an expansion side in season 3 of the TSC Futsal League before making it to the championship game against the Jersey Hooligans in season 4, losing 4-3. Assistant captain, Chris Dailey, was named MVP of season 4 after a 10 goal season.

Government
The city charter specifies a city council/manager form of government. In addition to city manager, the city council appoints the city attorney and prosecutor, and the city clerk. The city manager oversees 13 departments including Water and Power and Human Services. The city has municipal operating companies including the Rose Bowl Operating Company and the Pasadena Community Access Corporation. The city is one of three city members of the Burbank-Glendale-Pasadena Airport Authority, which is a joint powers agency that owns Hollywood Burbank Airport.

According to the city's most recent Comprehensive Annual Financial Report of 2009, the city's various funds had $583.0 million in revenues, $518.1 million in expenditures, $954,199,439 in net assets, $732.3 million in total liabilities, and $118,261,490 in cash and investments.

The city operates its own public health department and alongside Berkeley, Long Beach, and Vernon, are the only cities in California doing so. In 2016, the Pasadena Public Health Department received accreditation by the national Public Health Accreditation Board (PHAB). The Los Angeles County Department of Health Services operates the Monrovia Health Center in Monrovia, serving portions of Pasadena.

The Pasadena Police Department serves most of the city of Pasadena. Unincorporated portions of the city are part of Los Angeles County and are served by the Los Angeles County Sheriff's Department (LASD) and the Altadena Station in Altadena serves nearby portions of Pasadena.

The Pasadena Fire Department moved into its first formal and permanent station in 1889. Before that they had been housed in a ramshackle structure and summoned by the church bell. There were 24 firemen for two shifts.

The Department is dispatched by the Verdugo Fire Communications Center and is one of the three agencies that oversees its operations.

Water and Power Department

Pasadena Water and Power Department (PWP) provides services to an area  and includes areas outside of the city proper including unincorporated areas of southern Altadena, East Pasadena, Chapman Woods, and East San Gabriel. PWP has operated the Glenarm Power Plant for over 110 years.

Pasadena created the Pasadena Municipal Light and Power Department in 1906. On May 3, 1906, a $125,000 bond was issued to pay for the construction of a power plant. This first power plant was a wood frame and corrugated sheet iron structure which housed one 200-kW Crocker-Wheeler generator driven by a Fleming-Corliss engine, one 200-pound pressure boiler, a condenser, pumps, and other auxiliary equipment and only supplied power to the city's street lights. Expanding continued and more generating capacity was expanded and the city then offered power to commercial customers in 1908, and bought out Southern California Edison's Pasadena operations in 1920. In 1928 the city contracted with the federal government to buy electricity from Boulder Dam, later renamed Hoover Dam, which began delivering power in 1935.

During the Depression the power company extended its building programs to provide short term jobs for citizens severely affected by the collapse of the economy. Customers were permitted to work for the company for two-week periods to earn money for food, utility bills and housing. Following many further improvements, two 50,000 kW generating units in a completely new outdoor plant went on-line in 1955 and 1958. In June 1965, a 71 MW, 83 MVA reheat unit with steam backup auxiliaries was put into service to cover the growing needs for more power in the city.

In 1911, the city began condemnation actions against a number of small, local water companies. In 1912, the Water Department was created; in 1913, it began actual operations. The city continued to acquire small, local water companies for several decades afterwards, usually en toto, such as the Pasadena Lake Vineyard and Land Company, and sometimes in part, such as Las Flores Water Company's southern portions and San Gabriel Valley Water Company's operations in the southern reaches of Pasadena. In 1915, the Water Department added a chlorine generation system (from the Electro Beaching Gas Company of New York) to disinfect water taken from the Arroyo Seco. In the late 1920s, Pasadena took the initiative to obtain water from the Colorado River and lead the formation of the Metropolitan Water District of Southern California (MWDSC or "Met"). The charter for the MWDSC was signed on November 6, 1928. In 1967, the Water Department and the Light and Power department were consolidated into the "Pasadena Water and Power Department" (or PWP).

It operates a number of wells, has a spreading ground for the capture of surface water from the Arroyo Seco, and purchases surface water from MWDSC. Historically, water from the Arroyo Seco and Eaton Canyon were collected and distributed directly to the service areas. Not long after the city took over operations, 1915, chlorine was added to the Arroyo Seco water. In 1971 the John Behner Treatment Plant was constructed to give full surface water treatment to the Arroyo Seco water. Eventually as regulatory limits were made stricter, PWP ceased all direct surface water treatment.

A number of wells on the west side of the service area had become contaminated with volatile organic chemicals and perchlorate and had to be shut down several years. A treatment plant was built to remove these chemicals which began operation in July 2011.

Federal and state representation

In the United States Senate, Pasadena is represented by California's senators Dianne Feinstein, and Alex Padilla.

In the 2016 presidential election, 73% of Pasadena voters voted for Hillary Clinton, and 19% voted for Donald Trump.

Education

The California Institute of Technology (Caltech) is in the southern-central area of Pasadena. The Jet Propulsion Laboratory (managed for NASA by Caltech) is also in Pasadena. As of 2022, Caltech's 46 Nobel Laureates have brought 47 Nobel Prizes home to Pasadena. In 2005, Caltech dedicated an on-campus weather station honoring the late Nobel laureate geneticist and meteorologist Ed Lewis. The Ed Lewis Memorial Weather Station generates weather information for KNBC and thousands of other Web sites on school campuses in Pasadena and all over the nation.

Kaiser Permanente Bernard J. Tyson School of Medicine matriculated its first class in 2020, and waived tuition and fees for its first 5 classes. The school is highly competitive. For the 2021 admissions cycle, Kaiser Permanente's medical school had the lowest acceptance rate among all American medical schools.

Fuller Theological Seminary is one of the largest multidenominational seminaries in the world.

The Le Cordon Bleu College of Culinary Arts (formerly known as the California School of Culinary Arts) is located at East Green Street and South Madison Avenue. The school offers the Le Cordon Bleu accreditation and has two campuses in Pasadena.

Pacific Oaks College is located next to Pasadena's National Historic Landmark, the Gamble House.
Providence Christian College is located on the north side of Pasadena.

Art Center College of Design has two campuses in Pasadena—a Hillside Campus in the San Rafael Hills overlooking the Rose Bowl and South Campus at the southern edge of town. Art Center offers several visual and applied art programs.

Los Angeles Music Academy College of Music, founded in 1996, is a contemporary music school whose staff are active in the film, television and recording industries. The school is located between Colorado and California Boulevards on South Fair Oaks Boulevard.

Pasadena City College is a community college founded in 1924 and located on Colorado Boulevard, slightly northeast of Caltech. Until about 1970, the Rose Parade Queen's court was exclusively selected from its students.

The Pasadena Unified School District encompasses  and includes Pasadena, Altadena and Sierra Madre. There are 17 K-5 elementary schools, one K-8 school, five middle schools, two 6-12 (secondary) schools, and two high schools. There are also a number of private and parochial schools in the city.

Private elementary schools located in Pasadena include Judson International School, Walden, Mayfield Junior School, Chandler School, Polytechnic School, Westridge School, St. Andrew's Catholic Church, St. Phillip the Apostle School, and Sequoyah School. Private high schools include Mayfield Senior School, Judson International School, Polytechnic School,The Waverly School,Westridge School, La Salle High School, and Maranatha High School.

University of the People, the world's first tuition-free online university which awards accredited degrees, is located on Lake Avenue.

Pasadena had a public library before it was incorporated as a city. The Pasadena Central Library was designed by architect Myron Hunt and dedicated in 1927. Movies like Matilda, Legally Blonde and Red Dragon utilized the Pasadena Central Library for both its architecture and interior while filming. The library is also listed on the National Register of Historic Places.

Media

Civic Auditorium venue
The Civic Auditorium is on Green Street. It was designed to be the south cornerstone of Pasadena's Civic Plaza. Every year, the popular television competition, American Idol films their "Hollywood Week" show there. It was also the venue for the Miss Teen USA 2007 pageant. The main auditorium is large enough to have been home to the annual Emmy Awards ceremony for 20 years, from 1977 to 1997.

Television
Pasadena is the setting of many TV shows including Family (1976 TV series), Brothers & Sisters, Shrinking (an Apple TV+ series), Disney Channel's Dog with a Blog and The Big Bang Theory.

Pasadena Community Access Corporation oversees four television channels: The Arroyo Channel (Channel 32), KPAS (Channel 3), KLRN (Channel 95) and PCC TV (Channel 96). Local television news for Pasadena is produced through this station by the independently operated Crown City News.

ABC's TV show Splash was filmed at the Rose Bowl Aquatics Center.

Radio
Pasadena has been home to a number of notable radio stations. In 1967 radio iconoclasts Tom and Raechel Donahue took over an aging studio in the basement of the Pasadena Presbyterian Church and introduced Los Angeles to FM freeform radio. Broadcasting under the KPPC-FM call sign at 106.7 FM it quickly became the voice of the counterculture and provided the soundtrack to LA's hippie era. Early on-air personalities included Michael McKean, David Lander, Harry Shearer, and Dr. Demento. The staff was fired en masse in 1971 and the station lost its distinctive personality. KPPC later became KROQ-FM, which is owned by Entercom.

Today the primary radio station in Pasadena goes by the call sign KPCC located at 89.3 FM. Broadcasting from the Mohn Broadcast Center on South Raymond Avenue (and no longer on the Pasadena City College campus), this public radio station carries many shows from National Public Radio but maintains an independent streak, committing a large chunk of air time to presenting local and state news. Accordingly, the station has received numerous awards for journalistic excellence and continues to be an important part of the city's heritage. WilsonBlock100 Radio conducts audio interviews with local artists and covers events related to the local music scene. Their name derives from Wilson ave. in Pasadena's Bungalow Heaven neighborhood district.

Newspapers and magazines
Pasadena's largest newspaper is the Pasadena Star-News, first published in 1884. The daily newspaper also publishes the Rose Magazine. The Pasadena Journal a community weekly featuring the Black voices of the San Gabriel Valley since 1989. The Pasadena Now is a community news website covering stories in the community since 2004. The Pasadena Weekly, an alternative weekly, has been published since 1984. Pasadena Magazine is a magazine published by MMG Publishing with offices located on South Marengo Avenue. It started publication in 2008. Pasadena Outlook covers news from non-profit organizations, social event and K-12 private school coverage since 2007. Colorado Boulevard .net is a grassroots community news website that covers news from the Pasadena and Alhambra areas since its launching in 2013. Two weekly newspapers that were folded include Pasadena Sun, published by Times Community News in 2013 and Pasadena Register, published by Freedom Communications in 2014.

Transportation

Public transit

Pasadena is served by the Los Angeles Metro L Line light rail, which originates at the Atlantic Station in East Los Angeles. Opening in 2003 as the Gold Line, there are currently six L Line stations in Pasadena: Fillmore Station, Del Mar Station in Old Pasadena, Memorial Park Station in Old Pasadena, Lake Station in Downtown, Allen Station and Sierra Madre Villa Station. Construction began in June 2010 to extend the Gold Line east through several additional foothill communities of the San Gabriel Valley, including Arcadia, Monrovia, Duarte, Irwindale, and Azusa. It began revenue service on March 5, 2016.

Pasadena is also served by various bus services. Pasadena Transit exclusively serves the city while Los Angeles metropolitan area bus services Foothill Transit, LADOT, Metro Local, & Metro Express also serve Pasadena.

Trains

Pasadena was served by the Los Angeles and San Gabriel Valley Railroad, which in 1906 became the Atchison, Topeka and Santa Fe Railway, at a Santa Fe Depot in downtown when the Second District was opened in 1887. In 1925, the historical and traditionally styled station in Pasadena was opened. Originally, the Second District was an invaluable line; it served manufacturing and agricultural businesses throughout the entire San Gabriel Valley. But longer trains had great difficulty climbing the precipitous 2.2% grade at Arroyo Seco, between Pasadena and Los Angeles, requiring the costly addition of extra locomotives. The still-used Third District opened in 1888, just a year after the Second District, and rapidly took over most of the longer freight trains.

The Second District and the Pasadena Depot became well known; up to 26 passenger trains went through Pasadena every day. To avoid the media in Los Angeles, many celebrities chose to use Pasadena as their main train station, bringing it an association with old Hollywood.

Amtrak took over passenger rail operations in 1971, serving Pasadena with trains such as the Southwest Chief, Las Vegas Limited, and Desert Wind. On January 15, 1994, the final Southwest Chief train arrived in Pasadena. ATSF sold the line between Los Angeles and San Bernardino via Pasadena (known as the "second division"). (Now the Southwest Chief operates over the transcon via Fullerton.) The LACMTA L Line still uses the same right-of-way (although different tracks) as the Santa Fe. The old depot is still visible at the Del Mar station. Electrified Light Rail was the preferred alternative to Metrolink or similar style service because the city of Pasadena did not like or want diesel locomotives traversing the city. The construction of the Gold Line also allowed the closure of the former railroad crossing along Colorado Boulevard which meant that motorists and the Rose Parade would no longer be hindered by trains.

Airports
Hollywood Burbank Airport in nearby Burbank serves as the regional airport for Pasadena. The airport is owned and operated by the Burbank-Glendale-Pasadena Airport Authority. The airport is under the control of the governments of the three cities named. Most destinations from Hollywood Burbank Airport are within the United States, so Los Angeles International Airport and Ontario International Airport are the major airports that provide domestic and international commercial service. Other nearby airports with commercial service include Long Beach Airport and John Wayne Airport.

Freeways and highways
Four freeways run through Pasadena, and Pasadena is a control city for all of them. The most important is the Foothill Freeway (I-210) which enters the northwestern portion of the city from La Cañada Flintridge. The Foothill Freeway initially runs due south, passing the Rose Bowl before its junction with the Ventura Freeway. At this interchange, the Foothill Freeway shifts its alignment and direction, becoming an east-west freeway, exiting the city on its eastern boundary before entering Arcadia. The Foothill Freeway connects Pasadena with San Fernando (westbound) and San Bernardino (eastbound).

The Ventura Freeway (SR 134) starts at the junction of the Foothill Freeway (I-210) at the edge of downtown Pasadena and travels westward. This freeway is the main connector to the Hollywood Burbank Airport and the San Fernando Valley.

A spur of the controversial Long Beach Freeway (SR 710 in Pasadena) is also located in Pasadena. The Long Beach Freeway was intended to connect Long Beach to Pasadena but a gap, known as the South Pasadena Gap, between Alhambra and Pasadena has not been completed due to legal battles primarily involving the city of South Pasadena. The spur starts at the junction of the Ventura Freeway and Foothill Freeway and travels south along the eastern edge of Old Pasadena with two exits for Colorado Boulevard and Del Mar Boulevard before ending at an at-grade intersection with California Boulevard. Efforts to complete the Long Beach Freeway were met with strong opposition, including the possibility of using advanced tunneling technologies to overcome objections. The gap will no longer be constructed, with the $780 million earmarked for constructing the gap now allocated towards local infrastructure improvements. Pasadena is currently exploring options on the future of the spur.

The Arroyo Seco Parkway (SR 110), also known as the Pasadena Freeway, was the first freeway in California, connecting Los Angeles with Pasadena alongside the Arroyo Seco and is the primary access to Downtown Los Angeles. The freeway enters the southern part of the city from South Pasadena. Only one exit is actually inside city limits, the southbound exit connecting to State Street with access to Fair Oaks Avenue. At Glenarm Street, the freeway ends and the four-lane Arroyo Parkway continues northward to Old Pasadena.

Three state highways enter the city of Pasadena. Arroyo Parkway (SR 110), maintained by the city of Pasadena, runs from the termination of the Pasadena Freeway at Glenarm Street to Colorado Boulevard in Old Town Pasadena. While Arroyo Parkway continues north two more blocks, SR 110 ends at Holly Street.

Rosemead Boulevard (formerly SR 19) is a state highway in unincorporated Pasadena from Huntington Drive to Foothill Boulevard.

An obscure portion of the Angeles Crest Highway (SR 2) in the San Gabriel Mountains cuts through Pasadena near the Angeles Crest Ranger Station.

Historic U.S. Route 66 ran through Pasadena until it was decommissioned in 1964. The historic highway entered Pasadena from the east on Colorado Boulevard and then jogged south on Arroyo Parkway before becoming part of the Pasadena Freeway (SR 110).

The intersection of Fair Oaks Avenue and Colorado Boulevard in Old Pasadena is the zero-zero, east-west, north-south postal division of Pasadena.

Notable people

 See List of people from Pasadena, California

Wildlife 
Pasadena has a large, non-indigenous population of naturalized parrots. According to the "Parrot Project of Los Angeles", the parrots are of at least six species. Some residents have come to enjoy the birds as part of the city's unique culture, while others consider them to be loud pests. There are many theories explaining how the parrots came to inhabit Pasadena. A widely accepted story is that they were part of the stock that were set free for their survival from the large pet emporium at Simpson's Garden Town on East Colorado Boulevard, which burned down in 1959.

Sister cities
Pasadena has six sister cities as noted by Sister Cities International (SCI):
  Ludwigshafen, Rhineland-Palatinate, Germany (1948) pre-dates Sister Cities International which was formed in 1956
  Mishima, Shizuoka, Japan (1957)
  Järvenpää, Finland (1983)
  Vanadzor, Armenia (1991)
  Xicheng District, Beijing, China (1999)
  Dakar-Plateau, Senegal (2019)

The following are Friendship Cities: Kasukabe, Japan (1993) and Paju, Gyeonggi, South Korea (2009)

Photo gallery

See also

 Largest cities in Southern California
 List of cities and towns in California
 National Register of Historic Places listings in Pasadena, California
 USS Pasadena, 3 ships

Explanatory notes
The number of people counted statistically in demographics will sometimes exceed 100% because some Hispanics and Latinos identify as both White and Hispanic. See Race and ethnicity in the United States Census.

References

Further reading

External links

 
 "Early Views of Pasadena"
 Pasadena Museum of History

 
1874 establishments in California
1886 establishments in California
Cities in Los Angeles County, California
History of Pasadena, California
Incorporated cities and towns in California
Populated places established in 1874
Populated places established in 1886
Transportation in Pasadena, California